Claude White (12 January 1904 – 1981) was an English footballer who played for Mansfield Town.

References

1904 births
1981 deaths
English footballers
Association football defenders
English Football League players
Mansfield Town F.C. players
Footballers from Mansfield